Field hockey is an Asian Games event since the 1958 Games in Tokyo, Japan. The women's competition has been held since the 1982 Games in New Delhi, India.

Men's tournament

Results

Summary

* = hosts

Team appearances

Women's tournament

Results

Summary

* = hosts

Team appearances

Medal tables

Total

Men

Women

List of medalists

See also
Indoor hockey at the Asian Indoor and Martial Arts Games
Men's Hockey Asia Cup
Women's Hockey Asia Cup

References

Asian Games History

 
Sports at the Asian Games
Asian Games
Asian Games